Cupido alcetas, the Provençal short-tailed blue, is a small butterfly that belongs to the family Lycaenidae.

Etymology
The Latin species name alcetas refers to Ἄλκηστις (Alcestis), in Greek mythology a princess daughter of Pelias, king of Iolcus.

Distribution
First described from Austria by Johann Centurius Hoffmannsegg in 1804, it occurs locally in southern and central Europe, Turkey, the Urals, southern Siberia and northern Kazakhstan.

Habitat

Description

In these small butterflies the upperside of the wings is blue-purple in males, brown in females (sexual dimorphism). The wing edge is black, with a white fringe. The underface of the wings is pale blue-gray, with a series of small black spots encircled with clearer blue. On the underside hindwings usually there is no orange. Sometimes it is present a single orange-colored anal spot that does not reach the marginal black spot. Close to the anal angle usually is present a thin, very short tail.

This species is similar to the Short-tailed blue (Everes argiades) and to the Holly blue (Celastrina argiolus).

Biology
Adults fly from May to September. Depending on the location, the species produces two to three generations annually (in May–June, July–August and in warmer regions in late September). Larvae feed on leaves and inflorescences of various herbaceous plants of the family Fabaceae (such as Coronilla varia, Galega officinalis, Trifolium sp., Vicia sp., Medicago lupulina and Securigera varia).

These larvae are myrmecophiles, living in association with ants of the genus Formica.

References

External links

Cupido alcetas at Markku Savela's website on Lepidoptera
 Paolo Mazzei, Daniel Morel, Raniero Panfili  Moths and Butterflies of Europe and North Africa
 Lepiforum.de

Cupido (butterfly)
Butterflies of Europe
Butterflies described in 1804
Taxa named by Johann Centurius Hoffmannsegg